Güney is a town and district of Denizli Province in the inner Aegean region of Turkey. Güney district area neighbors those of four other districts of the same province from east to west, clockwise Buldan, Akköy, Denizli central district and Çal and ranges Eşme district of Uşak Province in the north.

Güney district area is located at one of the sources of Büyük Menderes River. It is situated on a steep hillside. Formerly a township depending Çal at first and then Buldan, Güney was made into a district center in 1948.

Pamukkale winery has many of its vineyards in Güney. Adıgüzel Dam, also on the River Menderes further up, is between the townships of Güney and Bekilli. Yet another dam in phase of being built is Cindere Dam also on Büyük Menderes River.

Güney is known for its vineyards. They produce one of the best wine grapes in Turkey. It is often labeled as the "Napa Valley" of Turkey. Many of the Turkish wine producers source a sizable portion of their grapes from local farmers in Güney. Wine producer "Pamukkale" has its own vineyards and production center located in this town. Types of grapes commonly grown in Güney include Shiraz, Cabarnet Sauvignon, Merlot, Kalecik Karasi, Cabarnet Blanc and Chardonnay. What makes Güney wine grapes so popular is a combination of climate, altitude and soil properties.

Epigraphic and numismatic evidence points at the existence of two ancient cities near Güney; namely Sala and Tralla, possibly constituting a border at one time between Lydia and Phrygia, but their exact sites could not yet be determined with certainty.

Image gallery

References

 

Populated places in Denizli Province
Districts of Denizli Province